Oz (a.k.a. Oz – A Rock 'n' Roll Road Movie also released as 20th Century Oz in United States) is a 1976 Australian film written, directed and co-produced by Chris Löfvén. It stars Joy Dunstan, Graham Matters, Bruce Spence, Gary Waddell, and Robin Ramsay; and received four nominations at the 1977 AFI Awards. The musical score is by Ross Wilson (frontman for Daddy Cool and Mondo Rock). The plot is a re-imagining of the 1939 The Wizard of Oz film transferred to 1970s Australia and aimed at an older teen / young adult audience. It was released on DVD in 2004 as Oz - A Rock 'n' Roll Road Movie : Collector's Edition with additional material. The poster and album sleeve for the American release was done by rock artist Jim Evans.

Plot summary
Dorothy (Joy Dunstan) is a sixteen-year-old groupie riding with a rock band, Wally (Graham Matters) and the Falcons. Suddenly, the van is in a road accident, and she hits her head. She wakes up in a fantasy world as gritty and realistic as the one she came from and learns she killed a young thug in the process. A gay clothier, Glin the Good Fairy (Robin Ramsay), gives her a pair of red shoes as a reward to help her see the last concert of the Wizard (Matters), an androgynous glam rock singer. She is pursued by the thug's brother (Ned Kelly) who attempts to rape her on several occasions. She also meets a dumb surfer Blondie (Bruce Spence), a heartless mechanic Greaseball (Michael Carman), and a tough biker Killer (Garry Waddell).

Cast
Joy Dunstan as Dorothy
Robin Ramsay as Glynn the Good Fairy
Graham Matters as Wally/the Wizard/record salesman/tram conductor
Bruce Spence as bass player/surfer
Michael Carman as drummer/mechanic
Gary Waddell as guitarist/biker

Production
Chris Lofven and Lyne Helms got the idea to make an Australian version of The Wizard of Oz while working in London in the early 1970s. Lofven was also inspired by David Bowie and wanted Graham Matters to feature.

They moved back to Australia in September 1974, and house sat at the house of David Williamson for six months writing the script (Lofven's sister Kristen was married to Williamson). The first draft was rejected for funding but the second got some development from the Australian Film Development Corporation in March 1975, shortly before it became the Australian Film Commission.

The budget was $150,000 with $260,000 in contra deals. The Australian Film Commission invested $90,000 plus a loan of $25,000 and Greater Union put in $25,000 with the rest from private investment. The money took six months to raise.

Joy Dunstan was a singer and theatre actress who was cast after Lofven saw her singing at the Flying Trapeze cafe. It was her first movie.

The film was shot in early 1976 over a five-week period near Melbourne.

Release
The film was a commercial disappointment on release in Australia despite receiving some excellent reviews. It may have been hurt by the fact the soundtrack was not ready before the film came out in July. However the movie was released in the US and was one of the highest-grossing Australian films there, grossing over $1 million before its release in the largest markets in New York and Los Angeles, and has become a cult movie.

Soundtrack
Wilson, Gary Young and Wayne Burt were all former members of Daddy Cool. Their biggest hit single "Eagle Rock" had a promo video directed by Löfvén in 1971. By late 1975, Daddy Cool had disbanded and Wilson was waiting out his contract with Wizard Records by producing a Company Caine album for his own label Oz Records. Wilson signed Jo Jo Zep & The Falcons with members Young and Burt to his label. Contractually free, Wilson recorded his first solo single "Livin' in the Land of Oz" and produced Jo Jo Zep & The Falcons' second single "Beating Around the Bush" both released mid-1976 from this soundtrack.

Track listing
Track listing for Australian version Oz - A Rock 'n' Roll Road Movie released on EMI in 1976; US version 20th Century Oz released on Celestial Records in 1977.

 "Livin' in the Land of Oz"  (Ross Wilson) —  Ross Wilson - 4:12
 "The Mood" (Wilson) — Ross Wilson - 3:31
 "Beating Around the Bush" (Wayne Burt) — Jo Jo Zep & The Falcons - 3:30
 "Our Warm Tender Love" (Gary Young) — Joy Dunstan - 3:46
 "You're Driving Me Insane" (Baden Hutchins) — Graham Matters - 3:25
 "Livin' in the Land of Oz" (Reprise #1) — Ross Wilson - 1:43
 "Greaseball" (Wilson) — Ross Wilson - 3:43
 "Glad I'm Living Here" (Burt) — Jo Jo Zep & The Falcons - 4:07
 "Who's Gonna Love You Tonight" (Wilson, David Pepperell) — Ross Wilson - 4:41
 "You're Driving Me Insane" (Reprise) — Graham Matters - 5:53
 "Livin' in the Land of Oz" (Reprise #2) — Ross Wilson - 1:45
 "Atmospherics" (Wilson, John French, Ian Mason) — Ross Wilson - 1:35
All songwriters according to Australasian Performing Right Association (APRA).

Charts

Personnel
 Ross Wilson – producer, arranger
 John French – engineer
 Peter Ledger — cover illustration & design

References

External links
 
 
 
 
 Oz at Oz Movies

1976 films
Australian fantasy comedy films
1970s musical films
Australian musical comedy films
Films set in Australia
1976 comedy films
1970s English-language films
Films based on The Wizard of Oz